Michael Christopher Adams (born March 25, 1974) is a former gridiron football wide receiver and return specialist from Grand Prairie (Dalworth) Texas. Mike Adams played high school football for the Sam Houston Texans in Arlington, Texas. Mike was a 3x first-team all district selection (89-91). He was selected as the district 8-5A MVP his senior season that ultimately saw him gather all-state honors that same season. Mike attended the University of Texas at Austin (92-96). Mike became a 4 year starter for a Texas Longhorn team that won conference championships in 1994, 1995, and 1996. Upon leaving school, Adams held every receiving, kick and punt return, and all purpose yards records. Only Ricky Williams and Cedric Benson have accumulated more yards than Adams. Mike was inducted into the Longhorn Hall of Honor in October 2021. He was drafted by the Pittsburgh Steelers of the National Football League (NFL) in 1997 and played as a rookie until a knee injury midway through the season ended his season. He later played for the BC Lions of the Canadian Football League in 2000 and the XFL's San Francisco Demons in 2001. Since his subsequent retirement from football, Mike has been an educator and coach for 14 years in various school districts across the state of Texas. He currently serves as an assistant principal at Canyon High School in New Braunfels, Texas. Mike continues to coach as well, serving as the passing game coordinator and an assistant track coach for Canyon High Athletics.

College
At the University of Texas, Michael  Adams was a three-time All Conference wide receiver. Mike was a USA Today freshman All-American (1992), the 1993 University of Texas team MVP and first-team All-Southwest Conference player in 1993 and 1995. Mike was a third-team All-Big 12 Conference player in 1996. Mike graduated as UT's all-time leading receiver in yards and receptions, touchdown receptions, all purpose yards leader, and set several other school records including the record for consecutive games with a reception, career 100-yard receiving games, and career kickoff and punt return yards. Michael  Adams averaged 17.2 yards per touch during his time on campus. Only Ricky Williams and Cedric Benson have more all purpose yards than Michael Adams.

Professional
Michael Adams was drafted in the seventh round of the 1997 NFL Draft by the Pittsburgh Steelers with the 223rd overall pick. He played for one season, seeing action in his first six games as a rookie until he suffered a season ending and ultimately career ending knee injury against the Indianapolis Colts on TNT Sunday night football in which he recorded a season high 5 kickoff returns for 123 yards. He recorded one career reception for 39 yards against the Tennessee Titans.

The BC Lions signed Adams for the 2000 season, and he played in eight regular season games. He caught 23 passes for 355 yards and two touchdowns.

Later life
Adams went back to school and earned a Bachelor’s Degree in Applied Learning and Development from the University of Texas in 2009. He then earned a Master’s Degree in Curriculum and Instruction from Concordia University in 2011. He became a teacher, coach and school administrator in Central Texas.

References

External links
NFL.com profile

1974 births
Living people
Players of American football from Dallas
Players of Canadian football from Dallas
American football wide receivers
Canadian football wide receivers
Texas Longhorns football players
Pittsburgh Steelers players
BC Lions players
Players of Canadian football from Texas